1536 Pielinen, provisional designation , is a stony Florian asteroid from the inner regions of the asteroid belt, approximately 7.8 kilometers in diameter. It was discovered on 18 September 1939, by Finnish astronomer Yrjö Väisälä at Turku Observatory, Southwest Finland. It was later named for Finnish lake Pielinen.

Classification and orbit 

Pielinen is a member of the Flora family, a large group of stony S-type asteroids. It orbits the Sun in the inner main-belt at a distance of 1.8–2.6 AU once every 3 years and 3 months (1,195 days). Its orbit has an eccentricity of 0.20 and an inclination of 2° with respect to the ecliptic.

Lightcurves 

From September to November 2011, four rotational lightcurves of Pielinen were obtained from photometric observations. One lightcurve analysis gave a rotation period of 66.2 hours, which is significantly longer than for most minor planets, that spin every 2 to 20 hours around their axis. However, slow rotators have periods typically above 100 hours. Photometric observations were taken by Petr Pravec (66.22 hours, Δ0.85 mag), Robert D. Stephens (66.34 hours, Δ0.80 mag), Giovanni Casalnuovo (66.1 hours, Δ0.75 mag), and Silvano Casulli (67.43 hours, Δ0.81 mag).

Diameter and albedo 

According to the space-based survey carried out by NASA's Wide-field Infrared Survey Explorer with its subsequent NEOWISE mission, Pielinen measures between 7.38 and 7.975 kilometers in diameter and its surface has an albedo between 0.253 and 0.30. The Collaborative Asteroid Lightcurve Link assumes an albedo of 0.24 – derived from 8 Flora, the largest member and namesake of this family – and calculates a diameter of 7.82 kilometers, with an absolute magnitude of 12.7.

Naming 

This minor planet is named after Pielinen, Finland's fourth largest lake in Finnish Karelia. The Koli National Park is located on its western shores. The official  was published by the Minor Planet Center on 20 February 1976.

Notes

References

External links 
 Asteroid Lightcurve Database (LCDB), query form (info )
 Dictionary of Minor Planet Names, Google books
 Asteroids and comets rotation curves, CdR – Observatoire de Genève, Raoul Behrend
 Discovery Circumstances: Numbered Minor Planets (1)-(5000) – Minor Planet Center
 
 

001536
Discoveries by Yrjö Väisälä
Named minor planets
19390918